Callan Ryan Claude McAuliffe (born 24 January 1995) is an Australian actor, known for his roles as Bryce Loski in Flipped and Sam Goode in I Am Number Four. He appeared as young Jay Gatsby in the 2013 film The Great Gatsby. From 2017 to 2022 he starred on The Walking Dead as Alden.

Early life
Callan McAuliffe is a native of the Sydney suburb of Clontarf. He is the son of Claudia Keech, and author and journalist Roger McAuliffe. His cousin is actress Jacinta John. Two of his grandparents were Irish.

McAuliffe attended Scots College, an all boys school in Bellevue Hill. He was the head chorister at the school and topped the London Trinity musical theatre exams, scoring a high distinction in 2008. He was a track athlete until he was injured, leading to a stronger focus on the performing arts.

Career
McAuliffe began acting at age 8, appearing in the Australian television series Comedy Inc. and Blue Water High. He then had a recurring role on Packed to the Rafters. He also starred in the Australian independent coming-of-age short film "Franswa Sharl" in 2009, and also had a role in Resistance (2009). McAuliffe made his American feature debut in Flipped, directed by Rob Reiner. He auditioned for the film while on vacation in the United States and won the role of Bryce, the lead. The film is based on the 2001 novel of the same title by Wendelin Van Draanen.

In May 2010, McAuliffe was cast in a lead role in the science fiction film I Am Number Four based on the novel of the same title by Pittacus Lore, the film is produced by Steven Spielberg and Michael Bay. He played Sam, the best friend of Alex Pettyfer's title character. He then appeared in the Australian miniseries Cloudstreet, based on the novel of the same title by Tim Winton, playing young Quick Lamb. McAuliffe appeared as young Jay Gatsby in the 2013 film adaptation of The Great Gatsby, directed by Baz Luhrmann. McAuliffe subsequently starred in Beneath the Harvest Sky (2013).

McAuliffe was cast as the archangel Uriel alongside Djimon Hounsou in Alex Proyas' action film, Paradise Lost, before the project was suspended. In 2012, he starred in the Australian television film Underground: The Julian Assange Story, as one of the teenage Assange's friends involved in the International Subversives. On 3 February 2013, it was announced that McAuliffe would star alongside Samuel L. Jackson and India Eisley in the live-action film remake of the 1998 Japanese anime Kite. In 2015, McAuliffe joined the cast of The Legend of Ben Hall, an Australian historical epic based on the true story of bushranger Ben Hall, where he portrays real-life gang member Daniel Ryan. In 2018, McAuliffe released his first novel, The Hill Ghost.

Activism
McAuliffe was announced as a National Ambassador for UNICEF Australia in November 2013. After his appointment, he said: "It is an honour to be invited to be a National Ambassador to UNICEF Australia and so important that is at a time where I can really contribute. My friends, the actors I work with, and I, all have shelter, food and family. We need to help the children who are without these things."

McAuliffe is the Youth Ambassador of Wolf Connection, a non-profit organisation based in California, which rescues wolves and wolf-dogs, and also has a youth education and empowerment program.

Filmography

Film

Television

Video Games

Accolades

References

External links

 
 

1995 births
21st-century Australian male actors
Australian male child actors
Australian male film actors
Australian male television actors
Australian people of Irish descent

Living people
People educated at Scots College (Sydney)